Michael Laufer (sometimes styled as Mixæl Laufer) is the de facto leader of the open-source anarchist biohacking network, Four Thieves Vinegar Collective. Laufer is notable for creating the EpiPencil, an open source alternative to the Epipen.

Education 
Laufer has studied mathematics including a Ph.D. and the CUNY Graduate Centre

Career 
Laufer is the director of mathematics at Silicon Valley's Menlo College, and a part time teacher of mathematics at San Quentin State Prison, California. Laufer is also a Senior Research Fellow at the UNESCO Crossings Institute.

In 2008 Laufer went to El Salvador where he saw hospitals that had run out of birth control medicine, he founded the Four Thieves Vinegar Collective shortly afterwards.

Laufer publicly shared videos in 2016 that illustrated how to manufacture generic version of the Epi-Pen epinephrine auto-injector from components readily available to the public.

Laufer is working on a DIY pharmaceutical chemical reactor that he calls the Apothecary MicroLab that will allow people to manufacture their own pharmaceuticals at home. The first version is able to manufacture pyrimethamine, the same drug that in 2016 increased in price in USA from $13 to $750 in 2019. Laufer's work is both about access to medicine and about the right to personal autonomy and information, seeking to undo a trend that has put healthcare decision-making in the control of financially motivated private actors. Laufer believes that providing lifesaving medication to those in need justifies violation of intellectual property rights. He is working to make it possible to manufacture the medications needed to treat HIV/AIDS, hepatitis C, emergency contraception and abortion medication.

In 2019 Laufer co-created a mesh-network sub-dermal implant that costs less than US$50, allowing humans to internally carry wireless routers. Soon after, he had one implanted in himself.

Laufer presented at the 2016 Hackers on Planet Earth conference.

See also 

 Josiah Zayner
Open Source Medical Supplies

References 

Living people
Hackers
Open source advocates
Open source people
Menlo College
San Quentin State Prison
Intellectual property activism
Citizen science
Do it yourself
Anarchists
Year of birth missing (living people)
American anarchists